Sabina Park is a cricket ground and the home of the Kingston Cricket Club, and is the only Test cricket ground in Kingston, Jamaica.

History
Sabina Park was originally a Pen (urban residence and adjoining land of a wealthy merchant, shopkeeper or professional), part of which was eventually sold to the Kingston Cricket Club for their grounds. The entire Estate was 30 acres. The Great House at Sabina Park Pen was named Rosemount.

Sabina Park Pen
Higman and Hudson tell us that the name is a "transfer name" ie a name copied from somewhere else, in this case "the region around Rome" of Magliano Sabina.

Shalman Scott, writing in the Jamaica Observer, claims that:

Known ownership of Sabina Park Pen includes:

Sabina Park Cricket Ground
From 1880, Sabina Park was rented by Kingston Cricket Club from Mrs. Blakely, the then owner, for an annual fee of £27. This arrangement continued until 27 November 1890 when it was purchased for £750.

Sabina Park became a Test cricket ground in 1930 when it hosted the visiting MCC team for the fourth and final Test in the West Indies' first home series. 

The picturesque ground is perhaps one of the most significant in Test cricket history recording the first triple century in the game with England's Andy Sandham's 325 versus the West Indies in the 1930 game. The 365 not out by Sir Garfield Sobers which stood as a Test record for over 36 years is also regaled, as is Lawrence Rowe's world record on debut 214 and 100 not out against the visiting New Zealand in 1972.

Sabina Park was the venue for the abandoned test in 1998 involving the touring England team. The test was abandoned after less than an hour's play due to the pitch being deemed unfit for play.

Prior to Independence Park opening in 1962, it would also host the Jamaica national football team.

Facilities

The members pavilion lies square of the wicket on the west side.

The Blue Mountains form a backdrop to the north, facing the George Headley Stand, with Kingston Harbour to the south. This view is currently blocked by the Northern Stand, built as part of the ground's redevelopment for the 2007 Cricket World Cup. 

The George Headley stand which dominates the south end is currently the only stand in the ground named after anyone, and has a capacity of just over 6,000. The Eastern Stands has given way to a "Party Stand" replacing the popular "Mound" stand. The general capacity of Jamaicans for excess is aptly demonstrated in the construction of the huge five-level concrete stand which hosts the outside broadcast facilities, players facilities as well as a fleet of upscale private boxes. 

In terms of size, Sabina Park is still relatively small. It can fit a 400-metre running track comfortably on its perimeter, but little else, and with its refurbishing, the capacity has increased to 20,000. 

With the commissioning of floodlights in August 2014, Sabina Park became the last of the international grounds in the Caribbean to have this facility. The ground is now capable of hosting day/night matches and this is especially useful for the Caribbean Premier League where the Jamaica Tallawahs play their home games.

A mural featuring 19 famous Jamaican cricketers was constructed outside the ground in 2021.

See also
List of Test cricket grounds
List of international cricket centuries at Sabina Park
List of international five-wicket hauls at Sabina Park

References

External links
 Satellite image at Google Maps
 Sabina Park at CricketArchive

Cricket grounds in Jamaica
Buildings and structures in Kingston, Jamaica
Football venues in Jamaica
Rugby league stadiums in Jamaica
Sport in Kingston, Jamaica
Test cricket grounds in the West Indies
1895 establishments in Jamaica
Sports venues completed in 1895
2007 Cricket World Cup stadiums